Petalostigma pubescens, known as the quinine bush is a rainforest tree native to Papua New Guinea, Queensland, Northern Territory, New South Wales, Western Australia. It was first described by the botanist Karel Domin in 1927.

References

Picrodendraceae
Flora of Australia
Flora of New Guinea
Plants described in 1927
Abortifacients